The Busan–Geoje Fixed Link (or Geoga Bridge) is an 8.2-kilometer (5.1-mi) bridge-tunnel fixed link that connects the South Korean city of Busan to Geoje Island. The name of the bridge is Geoga Bridge (거가 대교). The route opened on December 13, 2010 and shortens the travelling distance between Geoje Island and Busan by about 60 kilometers (37 mi). The new road has two lanes in each direction and carries National Road 58.

The fixed link opens Geoje Island to tourist-related development and saves US$300 million in costs related to traffic delays from the longer route.

Design and construction
The bridge was built under a public-private partnership. GK Fixed Link Corp, a consortium of seven Korean contractors, has a 40-year contract to build, operate and transfer the fixed link. The project is planned to cost US$1.8 billion. The government has provided only one-fourth of the cost; the rest is financed by the consortium to be repaid by tolls during the life of the contract. The lead contractor in the consortium is Daewoo Engineering & Construction, Co.

Designers involved with the project include COWI A/S (Denmark), Halcrow Group (United Kingdom), Tunnel Engineering Consultants (Netherlands), Pihl and Son (Denmark), Arcadis US (USA), and Ben C. Gerwick (USA).

Route

The route connects Busan, Korea's largest port city, to the shipbuilding industries and tourism destinations on Geoje Island. It replaces either a 210-minute journey by road or a 120-minute journey by ferry. The new route cuts travel time down to 40 minutes.

The fixed link starts on Geoje Island, crosses three islets (Jeo, Jungjuk and Daejuk) and ends on Gaduk Island. In addition to the tunnel between Daejuk and Gaduk islands, a bridge is used to cross each of the islets.

Bridge 1
The  bridge between Jungjuk and Jeo islands includes a cable-stayed bridge with a  main span and  side spans. This bridge provides  of navigational clearance and has two  diamond-shaped pylons.

Bridge 2
Between Geoje and Jeo islands, a  bridge includes a three-pylon cable-stay bridge.

Tunnel

It is Korea's first immersed tunnel. It became the second-deepest immersed vehicle tunnel after completion of the Marmaray (Bosphorus rail tunnel) in 2013.

The tunnel is made up of  segments constructed in a dry dock in Anjeon. Each segment was towed  by barges and sunk into place.

Toll 
(Since 2011)

See also
 Transportation in South Korea
 List of bridges in South Korea
 List of bridge–tunnels
 Lists of tunnels
 Øresund Bridge
 Tokyo Bay Aqua-Line
 Undersea tunnel

Notes and references

External links
Busan-Geoje Link in the Structurae database. Retrieved on 2009-02-22.

Undersea tunnels in Asia
Cable-stayed bridges in South Korea
Toll bridges in South Korea
Toll tunnels in Asia
Bridges in Busan
Bridges in South Gyeongsang Province
Infrastructure completed in 2010
2010 establishments in South Korea
Immersed tube tunnels in Asia
Bridge–tunnels in Asia